HOTT may refer to:

Mathematics:
Homotopy type theory

Games:
Halls of the Things, an early video game
Hordes of the Things (wargame)

Entertainment:
"Hanging on the Telephone", a song by the power pop band The Nerves, also recorded by Blondie
Hour of the Time, a shortwave radio show

Other:
Hot Topic's former NASDAQ ticker symbol